Arthur Bernon Tourtellot (July 23, 1913 – October 1977) was an American writer, screenwriter and producer best known for the book Lexington and Concord.

History

Arthur Bernon Tourtellot was born July 23, 1913. He was a fellow at Middlebury College in 1938 and was at a writer's conference at the Bread Loaf Campus in 1941. He served in the U.S. Coast Guard during World War II.

At the end of the war he served as the associate producer of two March of Time documentaries.  The first, Crusade in Europe, was based on Dwight D. Eisenhower's book of the same name.  He died in October 1977.

Partial bibliography

Non-fiction

Be Loved No More the Life and Environment of Fanny Burney (Houghton Mifflin Co Boston, 1938)
The Charles (Farrar & Rinehart, New York, 1941) (14th volume in the Rivers of America Series)
Selections for Today by Woodrow Wilson (Editor) (Duell, Sloan & Pearce,  1945)
Life’s Picture History of World War II (Editor) (Time, Inc., New York, 1950)
An Anatomy of American Politics; Innovation Versus Conservatism (Bobbs-Merrill Company, Indianapolis, IN, 1950)
Lexington and Concord (W. W. Norton & Co, New York, 1959)
William Diamond's Drum: the Beginning of the War of the American Revolution (Doubleday & Co., Garden City, NY, 1959)
Biography of William S. Paley, (unpublished manuscript, 1961–1967, Archives of Doubleday & Co., Garden City, NY)
Toward the Well-Being of Mankind, 50 Years of the Rockefeller Foundation (Editor)  (Doubleday & Co., Garden City, NY, 1964 and Hutchinson, London, 1964)
The Presidents on the Presidency (Doubleday & Co., Garden City, NY, 1964)
The Lost Revolution: The Story of Twenty Years of Neglected Opportunities in Vietnam and of America's Failure to Foster Democracy There (Editor) (Harper & Row, New York, 1965)
Benjamin Franklin: The Shaping of Genius, the Boston Years (Doubleday & Co., Garden City, NY, 1977)]

Associate producer

Crusade in Europe (Volumes 1 through 3) (March of Time, 1951)

Producer

Crusade in the Pacific (Volumes 1 through 5) (March of Time, 1951)

Screenwriter

The Guns of August  (Universal, 1964) (wrote narration)

Articles

"History and the Historical Novel Where Fact and Fantasy Meet and Part", (Saturday Review, XII, August 24, 1940)
"The Early Reading of Benjamin Franklin" (Harvard Library Bulletin, Cambridge, MA, 1975)
"Rebels, turn out your dead!—"  (American Heritage Magazine, August 1970    Volume 21, Issue 5)

References
IMDb Movie Database
Time magazine, March 14, 1949
Time magazine, September 17, 1951
The New York Times, December 25, 1964
Author Anniversaries
r Photo of 

American male screenwriters
1913 births
1977 deaths
20th-century American historians
Historians of the American Revolution
20th-century American male writers
American male non-fiction writers
20th-century American screenwriters